The Olympic games have been featured in numerous sport video games officially licensed by the International Olympic Committee or not. These games have more than one event and/or several sports, and have an Olympic theme.

They are one of the older video game genres, having first appeared with the 1980 game Olympic Decathlon. Since then, numerous titles have been released, usually in the immediate run up to the Olympic Games each game is intended to cover. Official IOC licenses became a norm since the first official game, Olympic Gold, was released in time for the 1992 Summer Olympics.

This is unrelated to the discussion surrounding having video games be included as an Olympic sport.

Evolution and criticism
Companies like Epyx, Accolade, U.S. Gold and Konami developed many of the early games. The genre is often overlooked by the gaming industry and considered little more than a novelty or memorabilia attached to the event, with some considering it as purely an exercise in licensing and merchandise. Gameplay is the common target for detractors, since it usually consists of the 'button mashing' formula used in Track & Field or 'joystick waggling' as used in Daley Thompson's Decathlon.

However, since they are released at regular intervals, they can be used as a way to compare how graphics in computer games have changed over time: from the CGA graphics of the first Epyx titles to the ever-evolving 3D graphics of more modern titles such as Athens 2004, Beijing 2008, and London 2012. Forbes argued that while the genre doesn't evolve, they would like to see how the various sports are rendered on next generation consoles.

From the 1980 Moscow Olympics up to the Tokyo 2020 Olympics, an official or unofficial Olympic tie-in game was released to coincide with each Olympic Games. The game of Beijing 2022 did not have any accompanying console video games.

Kotaku argues that the 4-year cycle nature of such games results in each release being on a new console, becoming a first-adopter decision for Olympic video game fans. In addition, the site noted that these games never have an overarching sense of narrative, which essentially turns them into a series of minigames. Thirdly, many of the Olympic sports already have dedicated titles out there which would appeal to fans more than these minigame collections which contain simplified gameplay versions of their sports. The games also lack a career mode, which is common in many of their sports video game counterparts.

Vice argues that prominently having successful Olympic sportspeople on the cover of Olympic games builds their public brand profile by introducing them to gamers. The site likened this to how some music-related video games can introduce gamers to new bands, or some media tie-ins can encourage gamers to explore the expanded universe.

List of games

Official

Mario & Sonic
Mario & Sonic at the Olympic Games (2007/2008) (Wii, Nintendo DS)
Sonic at the Olympic Games (2008) (Java)
Mario & Sonic at the Olympic Winter Games (2009) (Wii, Nintendo DS)
Sonic at the Olympic Winter Games (2010) (iOS)
Mario & Sonic at the London 2012 Olympic Games (2011/2012) (Wii, Nintendo 3DS)
Mario & Sonic at the Sochi 2014 Olympic Winter Games (2013) (Wii U)
Mario & Sonic at the Rio 2016 Olympic Games (2016) (Wii U, Nintendo 3DS, Arcade)
Mario & Sonic at the Olympic Games Tokyo 2020 (2019/2020) (Nintendo Switch, Arcade)
Sonic at the Olympic Games - Tokyo 2020 (2020) (iOS, Android)

Unofficial
Microsoft Decathlon (aka Olympic Decathlon) by Microsoft (1980)
The Activision Decathlon by Activision (1983)
Track & Field by Konami (1983)
Daley Thompson's Decathlon by Ocean Software (1984)
Hes Games by HESware (1984)
Hyper Sports by Konami (1984)
Track & Field II/Hyper Olympic 2 by Konami (1984)
Summer Games (I and II) by Epyx (1984–85)
Winter Games by Epyx (1985)
International Track & Field by Konami
Stadium Events/World Class Track Meet by Bandai (1986)
The Games: Winter Edition by Epyx (1988)
Konami '88 by Konami (1988)
The Games: Summer Edition by Epyx (Official Game of the USOC for the 1988 Summer Olympics)
The Games: Summer Challenge by Accolade
The Games: Winter Challenge by Accolade (1991)
Gold Medal Challenge by Capcom (1992)
Alien Olympics 2044 AD (1994)
International Track & Field by Konami (1996)
International Track & Field 2000 by Konami (2000)
Millennium Winter Sports by Konami (2000)
Sergei Bubka's Millennium Games by Midas Games (2000)
Konami Sports Series by Konami (2001)
ESPN International Winter Sports 2002 by Konami (2002)
New International Track & Field by Konami (2008)
Summer Athletics by dtp entertainment (2008)
Hyper Sports Winter by Konami (2010)
Hyper Sports Track & Field by Konami (2010)
Doodle Champion Island Games by Google (2021)

Games on other genres with another Olympic related license
Team USA Basketball, released for the Barcelona 1992 Basketball tournament with a USOC license
Olympic Soccer, released for the Atlanta 1996 football tournament
Izzy's Quest for the Olympic Rings, platformer based on Atlanta Games' mascot
Actua Ice Hockey, released for the Nagano 1998 ice hockey tournament
Olympic Hockey Nagano '98, released for the Nagano 1998 ice hockey  tournament

Critical reception 
Slate argued that Olympic video games are generally forgotten quickly like the Olympic games they are based on, and thought the genre had remained stagnant from 1983's Track & Field up to 2K Sports' Torino 2006. Kotaku noted that the Olympic brand is so huge that these video games are often non-entities by comparison while the event is happening. And once the event is over the game becomes obsolete too.

References 

 
Video game genres